Cheryl Youakim (born May 29, 1969) is an American politician serving in the Minnesota House of Representatives since 2015. A member of the Minnesota Democratic–Farmer–Labor Party (DFL), Youakim represents District 46B in the western Twin Cities metropolitan area, which includes the cities of Hopkins and Edina, and parts of Hennepin County, Minnesota.

Early life, education and career
Youakim attended Winona State University and the University of Minnesota, Twin Cities, graduating with a bachelor's degree. She served on the Hopkins city council from 2005 to 2014.

Minnesota House of Representatives
Youakim was first elected to the Minnesota House of Representatives in 2014, after DFL incumbent Steve Simon resigned to run for Minnesota Secretary of State, and has been reelected every two years since.

From 2019-20 Youakim served as chair of the Education Policy Committee, and from 2021-22 she was chair of the Property Tax Division of the Taxes Committee. Since 2023 Youakim has served as chair of the Education Finance Committee, and sits on the Education Policy, Taxes, and Ways and Means Committees.

Electoral history

Personal life
Youakim is married to her husband, Jacques. They have three children and reside in Hopkins, Minnesota.

References

External links

Rep. Cheryl Youakim official Minnesota House of Representatives website
Cheryl Youakim official campaign website

1969 births
Living people
Women state legislators in Minnesota
Democratic Party members of the Minnesota House of Representatives
21st-century American politicians
21st-century American women politicians
People from Hopkins, Minnesota